"Used To" is a song by Swedish singer Sandro Cavazza featuring Lou Elliotte. The song was released on 9 November 2018 and peaked at number 63 in Sweden. Remixes were released in February 2019.

Cavazza said "We wrote the song as a duet picturing a lost relationship, a couple dreaming about how it used to be perfect and not understanding how it all went wrong."

Music video
The music video for "Used To" was directed by Robin Kempe-Bergman, produced by Robinovich and released on 15 November 2018. Cavazza and Elliotte worked on the video clip for over a year, filming footage and taking pictures across Europe in cities including Oslo, London and Paris. Cavazza said "We wanted to make the video as relatable and genuine as possible, therefore we took thousands of pictures just so that people will be able to feel that it's real".

Track listing

Charts

Release history

References

2018 singles
Swedish pop songs
Sandro Cavazza songs
2018 songs
Male–female vocal duets
Songs written by Shy Martin
Songs written by Sandro Cavazza